Robert Michael Champion (born February 10, 1955) is a former Major League Baseball player from 1976 to 1978 for the San Diego Padres. He primarily played second base. His daughter, Autumn, played softball for the University of Arizona as an outfielder from 2003–2005.

External links

Mike Champion at SABR (Baseball BioProject)

1955 births
Living people
San Diego Padres players
Major League Baseball second basemen
Hawaii Islanders players
Baseball players from Montgomery, Alabama